Laingsburg may refer to:

South Africa 
 Laingsburg Local Municipality, in the Western Cape province
 Laingsburg, Western Cape, a town in the Laingsburg Local Municipality, Western Cape

United States 
 Laingsburg, Michigan, a city in Shiawassee County, Michigan

See also
Laing (disambiguation)
Laings